Nathan Nata ben Moses Hannover was a Ruthenian Jewish historian, Talmudist, and kabbalist.

Biography 
Hannover lived at Zaslav, Volhynia, and when that town was attacked by the Cossacks he fled to Prague and eventually Venice, where he studied Kabbalah under Rabbis Chaim HaKohen, Moses Zacuto as well as Rabbi Samuel Aboab. Later he became rabbi of Iași, Moldavia, and afterward, according to Jacob Aboab, he returned to Italy.

He died, according to Leopold Zunz (Kalender, 5623, p. 18), at Ungarisch-Brod, Moravia, on 14 July 1663. Jacob Aboab, however, in a letter to Unger (Wolf, Bibl. Hebr. iii., No. 1728), gives Pieve di Sacco, Italy, as the place of Hannover's death, without indicating the date. The place of his birth is equally uncertain. According to Graziadio Nepi-Mordecai Ghirondi, (Toledot Gedole Yisrael, p. 270) he was born at Kraków, but Steinschneider claims that "Nathan Hannover" and "Nathan of Kraków" were two different individuals.

Yeven Mezulah 

Hannover is chiefly known for his work entitled Yeven Mezulah (Venice, 1653; translated into English as Abyss of Despair in 1950). It describes the course of the Khmelnytsky Uprising in the Polish–Lithuanian Commonwealth from a Jewish perspective. Hannover in this work gives a brief description of the Polish Crown of the time and of the relations between the Poles, Jews and Cossacks, and the causes which led to the uprising. He also gives a very vivid picture of Jewish life in Poland and the yeshivot.
This work, owing to its literary value, was translated into Yiddish (1687), into German (1720), and into French by Daniel Levy (published by Benjamin II, Tlemçen, 1855). This last translation was revised by the historian J. Lelewel, and served as a basis for Meyer Kayserling's German translation (also published by Benjamin II, Hanover, 1863). Kostomarov, utilizing Salomon Mandelkern's Russian translation, gives many extracts from it in his Bogdan Chmielnicki (iii. 283-306).

In the late 20th century historians began to dispute the numbers given in Yeven Mezulah. They claim it overstates Jewish casualties during the Bohdan Khmelnytsky rebellion in 1648 and 1649. These authors question it as a reliable historical source in spite of its literary qualities. Yeven Mezulah was criticized in particular by Shaul Stampfer, Edward Fram, Paul Robert Magocsi's "Ukraine: A History", and Petro Mirchuk.

Other works 
Hannover's other works are: 
 Ṭa'ame Sukkah, a homiletic explanation of the Feast of Tabernacles (Amsterdam, 1652)
 Safah Berurah, a dictionary of the Hebrew, German, Italian, and Latin languages, and arranged in Hebrew alphabetical order (Prague, 1660) – in a second edition, by Jacob Koppel ben Wolf (Amsterdam, 1701), French was included
 Sha'are Ẓiyyon, a collection of mystical prayers, religious customs, and ascetic reflections; it was taken chiefly from cabalistic works, and was very popular among the Eastern Jews. It appeared first in Prague in 1662, and enjoyed such popularity that it was several times reedited (see Benjacob, Oẓar ha-Sefarim, p. 604). 
 Reference is also made by Hannover in his books to the following three unpublished works: 
 Neṭa' Sha'ashu'im, homilies on the Pentateuch
 Neṭa' Ne'eman, a cabalistic work
 A commentary on the Otiyyot de R. Aḳiba.

Jewish Encyclopedia bibliography 
 Hannover, Sha'are Ẓiyyon, Preface;
 Moritz Steinschneider, Cat. Bodl. cols. 2044-2047;
 Julius Fürst, Bibl. Jud. i. 361.

References

External links 
Video of Lecture on Nathan ben Moses Hannover by Dr. Henry Abramson

17th-century Lithuanian rabbis
17th-century Bohemian historians
17th-century Bohemian rabbis
Jewish historians
Talmudists
Kabbalists
Jewish refugees
Jews from the Principality of Moldavia
1663 deaths
Year of birth unknown
17th-century Venetian writers
Volhynian Jews
Khmelnytsky Uprising